Peace at Last is the third studio album by Scottish band The Blue Nile, released on 10 June 1996 via Warner Bros. Records.

Following the reissue of their first two albums in 2012 as 2-CD deluxe editions, Peace at Last was also reissued in a similar 2-CD version on 3 March 2014.

Background
Peace at Last was a considerable musical departure for the band, marking a shift towards a more acoustic sound. Unlike their prior two albums A Walk Across the Rooftops and Hats, which featured electronic instrumentation almost exclusively, Peace at Last was primarily driven by Paul Buchanan's acoustic guitar. A gospel choir made a brief appearance on the lead single, "Happiness".

Critical reception

Critical reaction to Peace at Last was mixed. Despite some initial high praise, including a five-star review from Q, in the years following the album's release it remained largely overshadowed by A Walk Across the Rooftops and Hats.

Track listing
All songs written by Paul Buchanan, except where noted.

"Happiness" – 4:39
"Tomorrow Morning" – 4:15
"Sentimental Man" – 5:05
"Love Came Down" – 3:35
"Body and Soul" – 5:16
"Holy Love" – 2:42
"Family Life" – 5:21
"War Is Love" – 3:33
"God Bless You Kid" (Robert Bell, Buchanan) – 4:56
"Soon" – 5:27

2014 Remastered Collector's Edition CD bonus disc
"Soon" (Laurel Canyon Mix) – 5:30
"War Is Love" (New Vocal Mix) – 4:46
"Turn Yourself Around" (Bell, Buchanan) – 4:46
"Holy Love" (Picture Mix) – 4:03
"A Certain Kind of Angel" (Bell, Buchanan) (unreleased demo) – 5:06
"There Was a Girl" – 5:28

Personnel
The Blue Nile:
Robert Bell – bass, synthesizer
Paul Buchanan – vocals, guitar, synthesizer
Paul Joseph Moore – keyboards, synthesizer

Additional musicians:
Craig Armstrong – string orchestration ("Family Life")
Calum Malcolm – keyboard
Eddie Tate & Friends – gospel choir ("Happiness")
Nigel Thomas – drums

Technical:
The Blue Nile – producer
Calum Malcolm – engineer

Charts

Release history

References

External links
The Blue Nile Official Web site
The Blue Nile Fan pages Web site
The Blue Nile's Altsounds.com Profile

The Blue Nile albums
1996 albums
Warner Records albums